Gospodinov is a Bulgarian masculine surname, its feminine counterpart is Gospodinova. It may refer to:

Anatoli Gospodinov (born 1994), Bulgarian football goalkeeper 
Bistra Gospodinova (born 1966), Bulgarian swimmer
Georgi Gospodinov (born 1968), Bulgarian poet, writer and playwright
Hristo Gospodinov (born 1979), Bulgarian football midfielder 
Kiril Gospodinov (1934–2003), Bulgarian theater and film actor
Marian Gospodinov (born 1974), Bulgarian football player
Olga Gospodinova (born 1992), Bulgarian ice hockey player
Stanimir Gospodinov (born 1975), Bulgarian football defender
Valentina Gospodinova (born 1987), Bulgarian football striker 
Vanya Gospodinova (born 1958), Bulgarian middle-distance runner 
Vasil Gospodinov (born 1993), Bulgarian weightlifter
Yordan Gospodinov (born 1978), Bulgarian football goalkeeper 
Zhivko Gospodinov (1957–2015), Bulgarian football player

Bulgarian-language surnames
Patronymic surnames